Bangladesh Academy of Sciences is an academic forum for Bangladeshi scientists and technologists. Established in 1973, it aims to fulfill the role of promoting research and development of sciences in Bangladesh.

History
After the partition of Indian subcontinent, the Pakistan Academy of Sciences was established in 1953. After the liberation of Bangladesh, 12 Bangladeshi fellows (the then East Pakistani) of the academy formed the Bangladesh Academy of Sciences in 1973. Muhammad Qudrat-i-Khuda served the founding president role until 1976.

Since 2014, BAS has administered the digital library Bangladesh Journals OnLine (BanglaJOL).

Presidents
 Muhammad Qudrat-i-Khuda (1973–1976)
 M Osman Ghani (1976–1988)
 S.D. Chaudhuri
 M. Shamsher Ali (2004–2012)
 Mesbahuddin Ahmad (2012–2015)
 Aminul Islam (2016–2017)
 Quazi Abdul Fattah (2017–present)

Fellows
List of the academy fellows.

Academy Gold Medal Awards
The academy awards prizes in senior and junior categories annually to scientists and technologists of Bangladesh in the field of physical sciences (engineering and technology) and biological sciences (agriculture and medicine).

Physical Sciences

Biological Sciences

References

External links

 
1973 establishments in Bangladesh
Scientific organizations established in 1973
Scientific organisations based in Bangladesh
Science and technology in Bangladesh
National academies of sciences
Learned societies of Bangladesh
Members of the International Council for Science
Members of the International Science Council